Coleophora inopinata is a moth of the family Coleophoridae.

References

inopinata
Moths described in 1994